UFC Fight Night: Shogun vs. Sonnen (also known as UFC Fight Night 26) was a mixed martial arts event held on August 17, 2013, at the TD Garden in Boston.

Background
The event was the first UFC event broadcast on Fox Sports 1.

The main event was contested between former UFC Light Heavyweight Champion Maurício Rua and Chael Sonnen. The bout was first linked to UFC 161, as Sonnen was mentioned as a short notice replacement for Rua's original opponent Antônio Rogério Nogueira, who was out of the bout with a back injury. Visa issues prevented Sonnen from getting into Canada, resulting in Rua being pulled from the event altogether.

Nick Ring was expected to face Uriah Hall at the event.  However, Ring was pulled from the bout and was replaced by Josh Samman Samman was subsequently forced from the bout and was replaced by returning UFC fighter John Howard.

Akira Corassani was expected to face Mike Brown at the event; however, Corassani pulled out of the bout and was replaced by Steven Siler.

Thiago Alves was expected to face Matt Brown at the event; however, Alves pulled out of the bout citing an injury and was replaced by Mike Pyle.

Andy Ogle was expected to face Conor McGregor at the event; however, Ogle pulled out of the bout citing an injury and was replaced by Max Holloway.

Results

Bonus awards
The following fighters were awarded $50,000 bonuses.

 Fight of The Night: Michael McDonald vs. Brad Pickett
 Knockout of The Night: Travis Browne and Matt Brown
 Submission of the Night: Michael McDonald and Chael Sonnen

Reported payout
The following is the reported payout to the fighters as reported to the Massachusetts State Athletic Commission. It does not include sponsor money or "locker room" bonuses often given by the UFC and also do not include the UFC's traditional "fight night" bonuses.

Chael Sonnen: $100,000 (no win bonus) def. Maurício Rua: $175,000
Travis Browne: $48,000 (includes $24,000 win bonus) def. Alistair Overeem: $285,000
Urijah Faber: $120,000 (includes $60,000 win bonus) def. Iuri Alcântara: $16,000
Matt Brown: $66,000 (includes $33,000 win bonus) def. Mike Pyle: $45,000
John Howard: $28,000 (includes $14,000 win bonus) def. Uriah Hall: $10,000
Michael Johnson: $36,000 (includes $18,000 win bonus) def. Joe Lauzon: $27,000
Michael McDonald: $30,000 (includes $15,000 win bonus) def. Brad Pickett: $23,000
Conor McGregor: $24,000 (includes $12,000 win bonus) def. Max Holloway: $14,000
Steven Siler: $20,000 (includes $10,000 win bonus) def. Mike Brown: $30,000
Diego Brandao: $40,000 (includes $20,000 win bonus) def. Daniel Pineda: $15,000
Manvel Gamburyan: $40,000 (includes $20,000 win bonus) def. Cole Miller: $26,000
Ovince St. Preux: $46,000 (includes $23,000 win bonus) def. Cody Donovan $8,000
James Vick: $16,000 (includes $8,000 win bonus) def. Ramsey Nijem: $14,000

See also
List of UFC events
2013 in UFC

References

UFC Fight Night
2013 in Boston
2013 in mixed martial arts
2013 in sports in Massachusetts
August 2013 sports events in the United States
Mixed martial arts in Massachusetts
Sports competitions in Boston
Events in Boston